The Mississippi Canyon is an undersea canyon, part of the Mississippi Submarine Valley in the North-central Gulf of Mexico, south of Louisiana. According to the U.S. Geological Survey GLORIA Mapping Program, it is the dominant feature of the north-central Gulf of Mexico. The US Minerals Management Service (MMS) applies the name Mississippi Canyon to numbered federal oil and gas lease blocks over a large offshore area centered on, but mostly outside, the submarine canyon.

Oil and gas exploration and production
In a separate section of the same report, note is made of acreage in the Thunder Horse project, MC778, acquired in 1988. Other projects noted for Mississippi Canyon include Thunder Horse areas/blocks MC775-778 and MC819-822, listed as completed grid PEA (programmatic environmental assessment) by BP.

An MMS list of 80 development systems of productive deepwater Gulf of Mexico projects from 1979 to 2003 includes 29 projects in the Mississippi Canyon area:

Deepwater Horizon explosion
The resulting oil slick quickly expanded to cover hundreds of square miles of ocean surface, posing a threat to marine life and adjacent coastal wetlands.

See also
 Offshore oil and gas in the US Gulf of Mexico

References

External links
 Gulf of Mexico GLORIA geology interpretation Page Contact Information: O'Malley, J., usgs.gov
 Formation of the Mississippi Canyon, GCAGS Transactions, Volume 32 (1982) (from Abstract) Coleman, J. M., D. B. Prior.
 Wonders of ocean life counted in massive census

Submarine canyons of the Gulf of Mexico